Alcolea de Cinca is a municipality located in the province of Huesca, Aragon, Spain. According to the 2004 census (INE), the municipality has a population of 1,245 inhabitants.

See also
List of municipalities in Huesca

References 

Municipalities in the Province of Huesca